The men's individual archery event at the 2008 Summer Olympics was part of the archery programme and took place at the Olympic Green Archery Field. Ranking Round was scheduled for 9 August. First and second elimination rounds took place on 13 August, and eights, quarterfinal, semifinals and medals matches were staged on 15 August. All archery was done at a range of 70 metres, with targets 1.22 metres in diameter.

Marco Galiazzo was at Beijing to defend his Olympic Gold Medal won on Athens but failed to qualify for the finals after being defeated in the Round of 32. Japanese Hiroshi Yamamoto, silver at the last Games, and Australian Tim Cuddihy did not participate at the Chinese Games.

64 archers from 37 countries qualified for the event at the Beijing Olympics. The 44th Outdoor Archery World championship, held in Leipzig, Germany, plus 5 continental qualification tournaments and a Final World Qualification Tournament selected 61 slots for the event, along with 3 Tripartite Commission Invitations.

The competition began with the ranking round. Each archer fired 72 arrows. This round was done entirely to seed the elimination brackets; all archers moved on to them. The elimination rounds used a single-elimination tournament, with fixed brackets based on the ranking round seeding. In each round of elimination, the two archers in each match fired 12 arrows; the archer with the higher score advanced to the next round while the other archer was eliminated. Unlike in previous years, in which the first three rounds used an 18-arrow match, the 12-arrow match was used throughout the 2008 tournament.

Schedule

All times are China Standard Time (UTC+8)

Records
Prior to this competition, the existing world and Olympic records were as follows.

72 arrow ranking round

12 arrow match

The following new world and Olympic records were set during this competition.

Results

Ranking Round

Competition bracket

Section 1

Section 2

Section 3

Section 4

Finals

External links 
 FITA
 Results

References 

M
Men's events at the 2008 Summer Olympics